Menotti may refer to the following people:
Given name
Menotti Aristone (c.1942–2013), American jockey 
Menotti de Tomazzo Sobrinho (born 1943), Brazilian football player
Menotti Del Picchia (1892–1988), Brazilian poet, journalist and painter
Menotti Jakobsson (1892–1970), Swedish skier
Menotti Lerro (1980), Italian poet, writer and academic

Surname
Gian Carlo Menotti (1911–2007), Italian-American composer and librettist
Ciro Menotti (1798–1831), Italian patriot
César Luis Menotti (born 1938), Argentine football coach and former player
Francis Menotti (born 1938), American actor and figure skater 
Giacinto Menotti Serrati (1874–1926), Italian communist politician
Tatiana Menotti (1909–2001), Italian operatic soprano

Sole name
Menotti, pen-name of Roberto Marchionni (b. 1965), comic-book artist and screenwriter